Dr. Akiba Eisenberg (20 September 1908 – 8 April 1983) was a former Chief Rabbi of Vienna.

Biography 
Eisenberg was born in Vác, near Budapest. During World War II, he survived by hiding with his brother in the outlying area with non-Jewish farmers. 

In 1948 Eisenberg became the Chief Rabbi of Vienna, after having served as the rabbi of Győr, Hungary. He would establish a Beth Din with the help of the Jewish Agency and advocate as a Zionist while serving this role. He would also be the target of an antisemitic terrorist attack, when a pipe bomb was detonated outside of his home on 4 February 1982. 

Eisenberg, working from Seitenstettengasse, the only synagogue in Vienna not destroyed by the Nazis, began  Jewish education within the city. In 1969, he was given the title 'Doctor,' by the President of Austria for his work in education.

Eisenberg died on 8 April 1983, at the age of 74, from heart failure, in Vienna. After his death, his son Paul Chaim succeeded him as the Chief Rabbi.

References 

1983 deaths

Austrian Zionists
Chief rabbis of Vienna
Holocaust survivors
People from Vác
Survivors of terrorist attacks